Fuhrmann or Fuhrman may refer to:

Surname
 Bärbel Fuhrmann (born 1940), retired German swimmer
 Emma Fuhrmann (born 2001), American film actress and model
 Ernst Fuhrmann (1918-1995), chairman of Porsche AG in the 1970s
 Irene Fuhrmann (born 1980), Austrian former football player
 Joel Fuhrman (born 1953), American physician advocating a "micronutrient-rich diet"
 Mark Fuhrman (born 1952), former detective of the Los Angeles Police Department, investigator in the O.J. Simpson murder case
 Louis P. Fuhrmann (1868–1931), Mayor of the City of Buffalo, New York
 Manfred Fuhrmann (1925-2005), German philologist
 Otto Fuhrmann (1871-1945), Swiss parasitologist who specialized in the field of helminthology
 Petra Fuhrmann (1955–2019), Austrian politician
 Susan Fuhrmann (born 1986), Australian retired international netball player

Other
 Fuhrmann & Schmidt Brewing Company (founded 1906), brewery in Shamokin, Pennsylvania